John Joseph Muccio (March 19, 1900 – May 19, 1989) was an Italian-born American diplomat who served as the first United States Ambassador to Korea following the establishment of the Republic of Korea in 1948. His title was "Special Representative of the President" (Harry Truman) in 1948–49 and Ambassador from 1949 through 1952. During his tenure, the Korean War began. In 1950, before the war broke out, he negotiated the first agreement on American military aid to Korea, worth $10 million at that time. Later that year, in testimony to Congress, Muccio called for increased assistance to Seoul and warned that Communist forces were a growing threat north of the 38th parallel.

After the North Korean invasion in June 1950, and the dispatch of U.S. army divisions to defend South Korea, Muccio informed the State Department that U.S. commanders had decided to fire on refugees approaching U.S. lines, for fear of enemy infiltrators. His letter, dated July 26, 1950, warned of “repercussions in the United States from the effectuation of these decisions.”
 On that same day U.S. troops began a three-day slaughter of South Korean refugees in what is known as the No Gun Ri massacre. An estimated 250-300 were killed, mostly women and children.

Through the first two years of the war, before he returned to State Department duty in Washington, Muccio was a crucial liaison in exerting U.S. influence over the impulsive and unpredictable South Korean president, Syngman Rhee, helping set the stage for armistice negotiations.

Under President Dwight Eisenhower, Muccio served as United States Ambassador to Iceland, where he previously served as Envoy Extraordinary and Minister Plenipotentiary.

Finally, Muccio served as United States Ambassador to Guatemala before he retired from the United States Foreign Service in 1961.

References

New York Times Obituary
Truman Library

1989 deaths
1900 births
Ambassadors of the United States to South Korea
Ambassadors of the United States to Iceland
Italian emigrants to the United States
United States Foreign Service personnel